Mukhtar (also spelled Muktar,  or "Muhtar") meaning "chosen" in , is the head of a village or mahalle (neighbourhood) in many Arab countries as well as in Turkey and Cyprus. The name is given because mukhtars are usually selected by some consensual or participatory method, often involving an election. Mukhtar is also a common name. In Arab countries it is more often a surname (laqab), whilst in non-Arab Muslim countries it is common as a first name (ism).

People named Mukhtar
 Ahmad Mukhtar
 Ahmed Mukhtar
 Al-Mukhtar, an early Muslim revolutionary
 Bilqees Mukhtar, Pakistani politician
 Ibrahim Mukhtar
 Omar Mukhtar
 Sheikh Mukhtar
 Mukhtar Ahmed Ansari
 Mukhtar Auezov
 Mukhtar Altynbayev
 Mukhtar Ansari
 Mukhtar Ashrafi
 Mukhtar Aymakhanov
 Mukhtar Dar, Pakistani-born artist and activist
 Muktar Muhammed
 Mukhtar Abbas Naqvi, Indian politician and currently the Union Minister of Minority Affairs
 Muktar Said Ibrahim
 Mukhtar Sahota
 Sheikh Mukhtar Robow
 Mukhtar Shakhanov
 Mukhtar Umarov
 Mukhtar Ahmed (disambiguation)
 Muktar Ali
 Mohamed Haji Mukhtar
 Ahmad Mukhtar Baban
 Mukhtaran Bibi
 Mukhtar Ahmad Dogar
 Sheikh Mukhtar Mohamed Hussein
 Qaryat `Umar al Mukhtar
 Abdullahi Sarki Mukhtar
 Mahmud Mukhtar Pasha
 Hany Mukhtar, Sudanese-German professional footballer

Dog name
 Mukhtar is a common dog name in Russia. Used in literature and films about service dogs, such as Come Here, Mukhtar!

See also
Mokhtar (name)

References

Arabic-language surnames
Arabic masculine given names